Michael Leroy Bickle (born July 17, 1955) is an American evangelical leader best known for his leadership of the International House of Prayer (IHOPKC). As the leader of IHOPKC, Bickle oversees several ministries and a Bible school. Bickle has written a number of books and served as the pastor of multiple churches.

Ministry
Mike Bickle became an evangelical Christian at fifteen when his football coach paid his way to a Fellowship of Christian Athletes student conference in Estes Park, Colorado. After listening to Dallas Cowboys quarterback Roger Staubach speak of his "personal relationship with Jesus," Bickle committed himself to become an evangelical Christian.

After serving as a pastor in several evangelical churches in St. Louis, Bickle moved to Kansas City to start the Kansas City Fellowship (now known as South Kansas City  Fellowship) in November 1982. Eventually, Kansas City Fellowship joined the Association of Vineyard Churches led by John Wimber in 1990, and was renamed Metro Vineyard Christian Fellowship. It remained a part of that association of churches until 1996.  During his tenure as the pastor of Metro Christian Fellowship, Bickle pastored a group known to both detractors and supporters as the Kansas City Prophets that, by some accounts, included Bob Jones, Paul Cain, John Paul Jackson, and others. Bickle asserted no formal group known as the Kansas City Prophets ever existed, but that the term "clustered a whole bunch of personalities into one group and one stereotype."

During his ministry, Bickle claims to have had several encounters with God, including hearing the audible voice of God and being taken to heaven twice.

In 1999, Bickle stopped working for the church that he was pastoring, Metro Christian Fellowship, then a megachurch of over three thousand members. He then started the International House of Prayer (also known by its acronym IHOPKC). IHOPKC is most well known for its daily prayer meetings based on its "harp and bowl" worship model that are held 24 hours a day, seven days a week, 365 days a year since September 19, 1999. IHOPKC also established a Bible college, known as the International House of Prayer University and several internships for young adults. In addition to these training programs, IHOPKC also organizes various evangelism and charitable programs locally and internationally. The ministry currently consists of approximately 2,500 full-time staff members, students, and interns.

IHOPKC organized an annual Onething conference at the Kansas City Convention Center. In 2010, the event saw over 25,000 young adults attend. The conference focuses on worship music and sermons on prayer, evangelism, and Christian eschatology.

Bickle is known for dressing casually while preaching and for his avoidance of "charismatic self-referentiality".

Bickle endorsed Ted Cruz for president in 2016.

Theology
Bickle's teachings have primarily focused on prayer, worship, fasting,  the Great Commandment, the Great Commission, spiritual gifts, and the Bible with a particular focus on passion for Jesus, the first commandment, and Prophecy, preparing people spiritually by understanding what Jesus said about the end times.

In 1988 Bickle began studying the Song of Songs, a book that he had dismissed in the past as being only for women. He interprets the Song of Songs as an allegory of the relationship between the body of believers (= the church) and God. After studying this book for several years, he began to focus his ministry primarily on the Great Commandment.

Bickle teaches extensively on prayer. Bickle began teaching on the Tabernacle of David in 1983 after an experience in which he claims to have heard the audible voice of God. He encourages churches and Christian ministries to develop a "culture of prayer" with worship and prayer meetings.

Bickle has focused some of his teaching on God's spiritual purposes for Israel. He believes that it is important for Christians to pray for the spiritual salvation of the Jews.

Reception
There has been criticism of aspects of Bickle's theology and ministry practices. Aspects of his ministry which have been particularly controversial include his view of the prophetic ministry today. Most of the criticism involving Bickle's ministry, however, focuses on the sexual activities of some of the ministers that were closely connected with his ministry in the 80s and 90s, including Bob Jones and Paul Cain though neither has been involved with Bickle's ministry for several years as a result.

However, as of 2017 Mike Bickle continued to praise Bob Jones and would credit him with the start of the International House of Prayer with no mention of the sexual abuse.

In 1990 Kansas City pastor Ernie Gruen published a report entitled "Documentation of the Aberrant Practices and Teaching of the Kansas City Fellowship (Grace Ministries)". After the publication of this document, Bickle announced that he was submitting to John Wimber's oversight and joined the Association of Vineyard Churches in part to address the issues raised by his critics. Bickle later noted that "We were tempted to say that the attacks were all of the devil. In retrospect, we see that God’s hand in all of this - even using the things that came from Satan’s hand as well. Some of the criticisms were valid (especially concerning our pride); others were not." Since that time, Ernie Gruen and Bickle have reconciled and forgiven one another.

Bickle's ministry has since been endorsed by several American charismatic leaders, including Dr. Jack W. Hayford, Bill Bright, Loren Cunningham, and C. Peter Wagner.

Bickle came under fire from the Anti-Defamation League for controversial statements deemed by them as antisemitic and intolerant of Jews.

Books
 Dynamic Intercession by Mike Bickle 
 Passion for Jesus: Perfecting Extravagant Love for God by Mike Bickle (1994) 
 Growing in the Prophetic by Mike Bickle (1996/2008)   
 The Pleasures of Loving God by Mike Bickle (2000) 
 After God's Own Heart by Mike Bickle (2003) 
 The Rewards of Fasting by Mike Bickle and Dana Candler (2005) 
 The Seven Longings of the Human Heart by Mike Bickle and Deborah Hiebert (2006) 
 Loving God by Mike Bickle (2007) 
 Passion for Jesus: Cultivating Extravagant Love for God by Mike Bickle (2007) 
 Growing in Prayer: A Real-Life Guide to Talking with God by Mike Bickle (2014)

References

External links
Official Website
International House of Prayer

1955 births
Living people
20th-century American male writers
20th-century evangelicals
21st-century American male writers
21st-century evangelicals
American Christian clergy
American Christian Zionists
American evangelicals
Charismatic and Pentecostal Christianity
Evangelical writers
Writers from Kansas City, Missouri